The AMF 2100 is an American trailerable sailboat that was designed by Ted Hood as a cruiser-racer and first built in 1980. The design's designation indicates its approximate length in hundredths of a foot.

Production
The design was built by the Alcort division of AMF, Inc. in the United States, between 1980 and 1983, but it is now out of production.

The boat did not sell in large numbers as it was competing with the J/24, which had been introduced three years ahead of the AMF design.

Design
The AMF 2100 is a recreational keelboat, built predominantly of fiberglass, with wood trim. It has a fractional sloop rig, a raked stem, a plumb transom, a transom-hung rudder controlled by a tiller and a lifting keel. It displaces  and carries  of lead keel ballast. The keel is lifted with a winch located in the cabin. The design has positive flotation and is unsinkable.

The boat is normally fitted with a small  outboard motor for docking and maneuvering.

The design has sleeping accommodation for four people, with two straight settees in the main cabin. Galley provisions include an optional portable stove, sink and cooler. The head is located in the bow, just forward of the keel trunk and partitioned from the main cabin by a curtain.

Operational history
George Day reported on the introduction of the boat in the December 1979 issue of Cruising World, describing it as "a small, no-nonsense, trailerable racer-cruiser. She has a retractable daggerboard, a dinghy-type spade rudder and a flattish underwater profile. She should sail quickly in light airs ...."

In a January 1980 review in Yachting, sailboat reviewer Tony Gibbs wrote, "at the risk of throwing away a terrific punch line, let me begin by saying that after sailing the new AMF 2100, we bought one. Elaine and I had gone to Marblehead one hazy fall afternoon to photograph the little weekender-racer and to see what her designer, Ted Hood, had to say about his latest creation. His words and the boat's performance must have been pretty effective, because we came away almost completely decided that this raised-deck 21-footer was the right boat at the right time for us."

In a September 1980 Motor Boating and Sailing review, Oliver Moore wrote, "because of the space below, flush deck boats make sense. Trouble is, the profile is often ungainly. With its new 2100, AMF has done an outstanding job of camouflaging the topsides with a striking three-colored speed stripe that reduces the apparent height. Moreover, the sleek look fits the boat’s performance."

In a 2010 review Steve Henkel wrote, "best features: Here is a boat intended to race and also to cruise, with a tremendous amount of usable space for her LOD. In fact, her big freeboard and beam give her best space by a good margin relative to her comp[etitor]s. Also note her unusually shallow draft with keel raised, making trailering relatively easy. Worst features: The lifting keel, weighing over 800 pounds and controlled by a winch down below, must be somewhat of a nuisance to operate while underway, particularly during tight racing maneuvers when speed is of the essence. Also the keel trunk sits squarely in the middle of the cabin, making passage forward to the head awkward."

See also
List of sailing boat types

References

External links
Racing an AMF 2100 video
Sailing an AMF 2100

Keelboats
1980s sailboat type designs
Sailing yachts
Trailer sailers
Sailboat type designs by Ted Hood
Sailboat types built by American Machine and Foundry